Najibullah (born  1979), often referred to as Mullah Najibullah or Hajji Najibullah, and also known by the pseudonym Omar Khitab (Arabic: عمر خطاب), is the leader of the Taliban splinter group Fidai Mahaz in Afghanistan.

Personal life
Najibullah is believed to have been born around 1979 in Zabul Province.

The Taliban and the Afghan Civil War
Najibullah joined the Taliban movement when he was 15 in 1994. He rose through the ranks of the Taliban, before becoming a subcommander under senior Taliban leader Mullah Dadullah in northern Afghanistan during fighting with the Northern Alliance. He acquired a reputation for launching daring attacks against Northern Alliance forces. In 1997 he was captured by the Northern Alliance, but bribed his way to freedom.

War in Afghanistan
After the September 11 attacks Najibullah retreated back home to Zabul Province and re-organised his forces. In 2003, he led the first Taliban attack on Afghan forces in Zabul province. He was captured the following year in 2004 and held in prison for eight months before paying a hefty bribe to his jailers and escaping. Then in 2006 he was arrested again. He allegedly paid Afghan judges and intelligence officers $25,000 to arrange his release.

He gained a reputation for brutality by beheading prisoners and alleged spies. Dadullah appointed him commander of hundreds of suicide bombers and operational chief of insurgent forces inside Kabul. When special forces killed Dadullah during a 2007 raid, Najibullah immediately took command of most of his  forces.

Najibullah organized a failed suicide attack in 2006 against former Afghan president Sibghatullah Mojaddedi and the successful kidnapping of one of Mojaddedi's deputies in the government's reconciliation program the following year. He is believed to have been involved in attacks on American and Afghan military convoys in Kabul and on U.S. outposts in nearby Wardak province. He was filmed by a French female journalist for France 24 in 2007 and 2008. He has claimed responsibility for  the kidnapping of New York Times reporter David S. Rohde in November 2008.

He is believed to be operating out of Kandahar Province in Southern Afghanistan.

Forming of Fidai Mahaz
In early 2012, Najibullah left the Taliban due to the opening of a political office in Qatar for negotiations with the Afghan government. He had been critical of the Taliban leadership and its negotiations with the government and Kabul amid peace-talks and a cease to the civil war in Afghanistan.

He went on to established the Sacrifice Front of the Islamic Movement of Afghanistan more commonly known as Fidai Mahaz.

He later claimed the responsibility of his group in the killing of the Swedish journalist, Nils Horner, 51. The radio reporter was shot down in a street of a heavily secured neighbourhood in the center of Kabul on 11 March 2014.

Death of Mullah Omar
When the Taliban founder and former leader died, Najibullah revealed that due to Omar's kidney disease, he required medicine. According to Najibullah, Mullah Akhtar Mansour poisoned the medicine that he got from Dubai, damaging Omar's liver and causing him to grow weaker. When Omar summoned Mansour and other members of Omar's inner circle to hear his will, they discovered that Mansour was not to assume leadership of the Taliban. It was due to Mansour allegedly orchestrating "dishonourable deals". When Mansour pressed Omar to name him as his successor, Omar refused. Mansour then shot and killed Omar. Najibullah claimed Omar died at a southern Afghanistan hide-out in Zabul Province in the afternoon on April 23, 2013.

References

Taliban leaders
Living people
1979 births